Lou Canon is the stage name of Leanne Greyerbiehl, a Canadian indie pop singer-songwriter.

The sister-in-law of Hayden, Canon worked as an elementary school teacher, pursuing music on the side as a hobby, until one year Hayden gave her some time in his home recording studio as a Christmas gift. The sessions resulted in her debut album, which was released in 2011 on Hayden's Hardwood Records.

Canon also appears as a guest vocalist on Hayden's 2013 album Us Alone, and toured with him on several concert dates to support the album.

She has since signed with Paper Bag Records with the release of her second album, Suspicious.

Her third album, Audomatic Body, was released in 2020. In January 2022 she released Reimagine the Body, a six-track EP of songs from Audomatic Body remixed by Époque Selector, Graham Walsh, July Talk, Lido Pimienta, Witch Prophet and Zoon.

Discography
 Lou Canon (Hardwood - 2011)
 Suspicious (Paper Bag - 2017)
 Audomatic Body (Paper Bag - 2020)
 Reimagine the Body (2022)

References

External links
Lou Canon

21st-century Canadian women singers
Canadian women singer-songwriters
Canadian singer-songwriters
Canadian pop singers
Canadian indie pop musicians
Musicians from Toronto
Living people
Year of birth missing (living people)
Paper Bag Records artists